WTBO is an oldies formatted broadcast radio station licensed to Cumberland, Maryland, serving Cumberland and Frostburg in Maryland and Keyser in West Virginia.  WTBO is owned and operated by Forever Media.

History
On December 13, 1928, WTBO signed on for the first time.

On December 26, 2006, Chazz Offutt collapsed and died, at the age of 66, during his daily morning show on WTBO and sister-station WFRB.

On April 1, 2015, WTBO (after six hours of stunting with various versions of "Proud Mary") changed their format to Adult Contemporary, branded as "105.7 The River".  WTBO and sister stations WFRB, WFRB-FM, and WKGO were sold by Dix Communications to Forever Media for $4 million on September 3, 2015.  On March 8, 2016 WTBO changed their format to top 40/CHR, branded as "Happy 105-7". As with many other stations owned by Forever their programming comes from Westwood One Hot AC Local.

On April 18, 2018 WTBO changed their format from hot adult contemporary to oldies, branded as "The Best Oldies".

Previous Logo

See also
M. Virginia Rosenbaum, former station manager

References

External links
WTBO Online

1928 establishments in Maryland
Oldies radio stations in the United States
Radio stations established in 1928
TBO